The 2022 Pacific Four Series was the second edition of the Pacific Four Series. The competition was hosted by New Zealand from 6 to 18 June. Matches were played at two of the venues which will host the delayed 2021 Rugby World Cup – The Trusts Arena in West Auckland and the Semenoff Stadium in Whangārei.

New Zealand won their first series title after defeating the United States 50–6 in the final round.

Format 
With New Zealand and Australia joining the competition alongside the United States and Canada, six matches were played in a round-robin format.

Participants

Match officials 
On 1 June World Rugby announced the team of officials selected for the Pacific Four Series in New Zealand. All eight were announced as part of a wider squad of officials for the delayed 2021 Rugby World Cup.

  Lauren Jenner
  Sara Cox
  Maggie Cogger-Orr
  Amber McLachlan

  Julianne Zussman
  Tyler Miller
  Chris Assmus
  Lee Jeffrey

Table

Fixtures

Round 1

Round 2

Round 3

Broadcast 
All the Pacific Four Series matches were broadcast live in New Zealand on Spark Sport.

References 

International women's rugby union competitions hosted by New Zealand
Pacific Four
2022 in women's rugby union
2022 in American rugby union
2022 in Australian rugby union
2022 in Canadian rugby union
2022 in New Zealand rugby union
2022 in American women's sports
2022 in Canadian women's sports
Pacific Four Series
Pacific Four Series